Domingo Lorenzo Rodríguez is a Spanish politician. He was elected to the Congress of Deputies in the December 20, 2015 general election, standing as a Ciudadanos (C's) candidate in Castellón province.

On July 22, 2015 he was named alternate senator.

Rodríguez holds a master's degree in Law. He formed part of the Regional Police Brigade of Madrid.

References

Citizens (Spanish political party) politicians
Living people
Members of the 11th Congress of Deputies (Spain)
Members of the 12th Congress of Deputies (Spain)
Place of birth missing (living people)
Year of birth missing (living people)